Ocean and San Leandro is a light rail stop on the Muni Metro K Ingleside line, located between the Balboa Terrace and Ingleside Terrace neighborhoods of San Francisco, California. It originally opened around 1896 on the United Railroads (12) line; K Ingleside service began in 1919. The stop consists of two side platforms, with the eastbound (outbound) platform located on Ocean Avenue west of the intersection with San Leandro Way, and vice versa.

History 

The private Market Street Railway opened a branch – built in just six days – of its Mission Street line along Ocean Avenue to Victoria Street on December 4, 1895, to serve the new Ingleside Racetrack. The line was extended through less populated areas to the Ingleside House (where Ocean Avenue now meets Junipero Serra Boulevard) shortly thereafter. The 1906 earthquake damaged many cable car and streetcar lines; the URR resumed service on the Ocean Avenue (12) line on May 6, 1906.

On November 25, 1918, the city and the struggling URR signed the "Parkside Agreements", which allowed Muni streetcars to use URR trackage on Junipero Serra Boulevard, Ocean Avenue, and Taraval Street, in exchange for a cash payment and shared maintenance costs. The K Ingleside line was extended south on Junipero Serra Boulevard and east on Ocean to Ocean and Miramar on February 21, 1919. The city purchased the private company (renamed Market Street Railway in 1921) in 1944; route 12 service was removed from Ocean Avenue on April 8, 1945, leaving just the K Ingleside.

The line was closed and replaced by buses from February 2001 to June 7, 2003, for the Ocean Avenue Reconstruction and Improvement Project, a major street repaving and utility replacement project. Muni boarding islands were reconstructed at the stations along Ocean Avenue.

References

External links 

SFMTA – Ocean Ave & San Leandro Way inbound and outbound
SFBay Transit (unofficial) – Ocean Ave & San Leandro Way

Muni Metro stations